The Bellevue Gazette was an American bi-weekly newspaper published Wednesdays and Saturdays in Bellevue, Ohio. It was owned by Civitas Media, a subsidiary of Versa Capital Management.

First appearing as a short-lived weekly newspaper in 1851,  The Bellevue Gazette was published continuously since being refounded in October 1867, and daily since 1899, originally as The Bellevue Record, then The Evening Gazette, before adopting the name Bellevue Gazette in 1906.

For more than a century, The Bellevue Gazette was the flagship of The Gazette Publishing Company, a chain that also included eight weeklies across Northwestern Ohio. The company, owned by the Callaghan family, was sold to Brown Publishing Company of Cincinnati in 2007.

Brown declared bankruptcy and was reconstituted as Ohio Community Media in 2010.  The company, including The Bellevue Gazette, was purchased for an undisclosed sum in 2011 by Philadelphia-based Versa Capital Management.

On June 1, 2016, the Bellevue Gazette published its final addition after Civitas Media announced both the Bellevue paper and the Clyde Enterprise would be shuttered.

References

External links 
 The Bellevue Gazette website
 Ohio Community Media

Publications established in 1851
Defunct newspapers published in Ohio
1851 establishments in Ohio
2016 disestablishments in Ohio
Publications disestablished in 2016
Gazette